Mobile Module Connector 1 (MMC-1) is a 280-pin microprocessor cartridge developed by Intel for used by their mobile Pentium, Pentium MMX, Pentium II and Celeron processors. It contains the microprocessor and its associated L2 cache, a 430TX for the Pentium or a 443BX for the Pentium II northbridge, and a voltage regulator.

External links
 Intel Datasheet

Intel products